Naser Jason Abdo (born April 1, 1990) is an American former US Army Private First Class who was arrested July 28, 2011, near Fort Hood, Texas, and was held without bond for possession of an unregistered firearm and allegedly planning to attack a restaurant frequented by soldiers from the base. He was convicted in federal court on May 24, 2012, of attempted use of a weapon of mass destruction, attempted murder of federal employees, and weapons charges. He was sentenced on August 10, 2012, to two consecutive life terms, plus 60 years.

After Abdo applied for conscientious objector status in the spring of 2010 pending his deployment to Afghanistan, the Army approved his discharge. While processing him, officials found child pornography on his government-issued computer and in June 2010, the Army recommended that he be court-martialed. Abdo denied the charges, and went AWOL from Fort Campbell, Kentucky, over the July 4th weekend.

Abdo is alleged to have planned the bombing because of his opposition as a Muslim to the U.S. War in Afghanistan. However, the US Attorney in the case, Robert Pitman, compared the plot to the 2012 mass murders by two other American men: the shootings at a movie theatre in Aurora, Colorado, and at a Sikh temple in suburban Milwaukee. He said that Abdo had planned to use violence "to advance [his] twisted agenda."

Early life
His mother is an American  Christian, and his father is a Palestinian-Jordanian Muslim. When Naser was 3, his parents divorced, and he lived most of his childhood with his father. In Garland, the boy attended Richardson Terrace Elementary School, South Garland High School and Berkner High School. According to Abdo's 2010 statement to the Army, at the age of 17, he began practicing Islam. The following year, he took classes in mass communication at the American University in Dubai.

His father lived for about 25 years in the United States. After being convicted in 2006 of soliciting a minor over the Internet, the senior Abdo served three years of a five-year sentence in the Texas Department of Criminal Justice. The US government deported him back to Jordan in 2010.

Army
With no job prospects, soon before his 19th birthday, Abdo joined the United States Army in March 2009. At the time of the Fort Hood shootings later that year, he condemned the actions of Nidal Malik Hasan, who was arrested and charged in the case.

Abdo's brigade from Fort Campbell, Kentucky, was deployed to Afghanistan in February 2010. Abdo stayed behind to continue authorized studies in language school to learn Pashto, one of the predominant languages in the area where US troops are deployed in the country. He was due to deploy to Afghanistan in June 2010, but applied that spring for conscientious objector status. He said the prospect of deployment had forced him to examine his beliefs, and as a Muslim he could not serve in Afghanistan against Muslim peoples. In an interview with Al-Jazeera TV, which aired on August 21, 2010 (as translated by MEMRI), Abdo said, "I don't believe I can involve myself in an army that wages war against Muslims. I don't believe I could sleep at night if I take part, in any way, in the killing of a Muslim." The Army approved his discharge, but it was put on hold when Army officials discovered child pornography on his government-issued computer while processing him out.

At a June 15 hearing, Army officials recommended that Abdo be court-martialed. After being charged with possessing child pornography, which he denied, Abdo went AWOL from Fort Campbell during the July 4 weekend in 2011.

In the spring, two anti-war groups, Iraq Veterans Against the War and Courage to Resist, had initially supported Abdo's conscientious objector bid. In a statement for Iraq Veterans Against the War, Abdo had written, "Only when the military and America can disassociate Muslims from terror can we move onto a brighter future of religious collaboration and dialogue that defines America and makes me proud to be an American." After Abdo's arrest, a spokesman for Iraq Veterans condemned the planned attack, saying it was utterly against their principles. Upon learning of Abdo's arrest on the pornography charges in June 2010, Courage to Resist, which had contributed to Abdo's legal fees in the conscientious objector case, said in a statement that it had removed the private's profile from its website and no longer supported him.

Arrest
On July 27, 2011, the staff of the Guns Galore gunstore in Killeen, Texas, near Fort Hood noted that Abdo bought an unusually large amount of smokeless gunpowder, three boxes of shotgun ammunition, and a magazine for a pistol. A clerk notified the Killeen Police Department, who tracked Abdo to the Best Value Inn and Suites. Coincidentally, Guns Galore was the store in which Nidal Malik Hasan bought the FN Five-seven pistol used in the 2009 Fort Hood shooting, as well as the store where the killer in the 2014 Fort Hood shootings allegedly bought his pistol.

At Abdo's hotel room, Killeen police found a handgun and the ingredients for an explosive device, including gunpowder, shrapnel, and pressure cookers. Also in the room was an article entitled, "Make a bomb in the kitchen of your Mom," from Inspire magazine, the English-language publication of Al Qaeda. According to Daniel Pipes of The Washington Times, the "materials in Pfc. Abdo's possession corresponded precisely to the "ingredients" listed in the Inspire magazine article on bomb-making." Abdo had bought a uniform with Fort Hood patches from a military surplus store to fit in with local soldiers.

Court hearing
In a court hearing on July 29, 2011, Abdo was charged with possession of an unregistered destructive device. He did not enter a plea at that time. He was ordered held without bond. While leaving the courtroom, Abdo shouted: "Nidal Hasan — Ft. Hood 2009" in reference to the Army major Hasan charged with the Fort Hood shooting. Abdo also invoked the name of Abeer Qassim al-Janabi, a 14-year-old girl raped and murdered by United States Army soldiers in Iraq. (Five current or former soldiers were charged and convicted in the case.)

According to court papers, Abdo "admitted that he planned to assemble two bombs in the hotel room using gun powder and shrapnel packed into pressure cookers" to explode at a restaurant popular with soldiers. After hearing testimony from the FBI in February 2012, the federal judge stated that Abdo could be indicted on additional charges. He represented himself in court and again denied that he had possessed child pornography.

On May 24, 2012, Abdo was found guilty in federal court of attempted use of a weapon of mass destruction, attempted murder of federal employees,  possession of a weapon in furtherance of a federal crime of violence, and possession of a firearm in furtherance of a federal crime of violence. On August 10, 2012, he was sentenced to two life terms plus 60 years in prison.

Abdo is currently being held at ADX Florence.

Abdo is the third American Muslim soldier since the United States (US) started warfare in Afghanistan and Iraq to be charged with actions related to attacks on fellow US soldiers. He was charged for a bomb plot, not terrorism, as he acted alone and was not part of a terrorist organization.

In 2003 at the start of the Iraq War, Sgt. Hasan Karim Akbar killed two officers and wounded 14 soldiers of the 101st Airborne in a fragging: a grenade and shooting attack at their base in Kuwait. Such incidents were rare in the Iraq War but frequent by aggrieved troops during the Vietnam War. The November 2009 shooting incident at Fort Hood, by the US Army psychiatrist, Nidal Malik Hasan, has been characterized by the Department of Defense as "workplace violence" pending the major's court-martial.

The U.S. Attorney in the Abdo case, Robert Pitman, compared the AWOL soldier's plot to mass murders in 2012 by two other American men: shootings "at a movie theatre near Denver and a Sikh temple in suburban Milwaukee. 'In the wake of the tragic events in Colorado and Wisconsin, this is yet another reminder that there are those among us who would use or plan to use violence to advance their twisted agenda,' Pitman said."

References

External links
Spaetzel, Nicole. "Case 45: Abdo." In: Mueller, John (editor, from Ohio State University). The American Cases. March 14, 2014.

1990 births
Living people
American Muslims
American conscientious objectors
Fort Hood
United States Army soldiers
American people of Jordanian descent
American people convicted of attempted murder
American prisoners sentenced to life imprisonment
People from Garland, Texas
Child pornography
Inmates of ADX Florence
Criminals from Texas
21st-century American criminals
Prisoners sentenced to life imprisonment by the United States federal government